Every Night is the 8th studio album by a Japanese singer-songwriter Yōsui Inoue, released in December 1980.

Track listing
All songs written and composed by Yōsui Inoue

Side one
All songs arranged by Akira Inoue (except "Crazy Love" and "Seken-jin de Go" arranged by Shigeru Suzuki)
""
""
""
"Winter Wind"
""

Side two
All songs arranged by Akira Inoue (except "I yai yai" and "Pool ni Oyogu Salmon" arranged by Shigeru Suzuki)
"Every Night"
""
"I yai yai"
""
""

Personnel
Yōsui Inoue – Vocals, acoustic guitar
Chūei Yoshikawa – Acoustic guitar, autoharp, ukulele
Tōru Aoyama – Electric guitar, acoustic guitar
Shigeru Suzuki – Electric guitar
Hideki Matsubara – Electric guitar
Tsuyoshi Kon – Electric guitar, pedal-steel guitar
Youichi Taniguchi – Steel guitar
Akihiro Tanaka – Bass guitar
Shigeru Okazawa – Bass guitar
Yasuharu Nakanishi – Acoustic piano
Hidetoshi Yamada – Acoustic piano
Akira Inoue – Acoustic piano, Synthesizer, hammond organ
Makiko Tashiro – Acoustic piano, Synthesizer, hammond organ
Hiroshi Shibui – Synthesizer
Pecker – Percussion
Yoshinori Sugawara – Percussion
Koutarou Ishii – Percussion
Hideo Yamaki – Drums
Yutaka Uehara (credited to "Yukari Uehara") – Drums
Takeo Kikuchi – Drums
Masahiro Miyazaki – Drums
Jake H. Conception – Saxophone
Kenji Nakazawa – Flugel horn
Ōno Strings – Strings
Eve – Background vocals
Tokyo Concerts – Background vocals

Chart positions

Release history

References

1980 albums
Yōsui Inoue albums